Kyrgyzstan competed at the World Games 2017  in Wroclaw, Poland, from 20 July 2017 to 30 July 2017.

Competitors

Kickboxing
Kyrgyzstan has qualified at the 2017 World Games:

Men's -63,5 kg - 1 quota (Aleksei Fedoseev)
Men's -67 kg – 1 quota (Erik Voinov)
Men's -81 kg – 1 quota (Ruslan Musaev)
Women's -56 kg – 1 quota (Shakhriza Khalilova)

References 

Nations at the 2017 World Games
2017 in Kyrgyzstani sport
2017